TUMT may refer to:
 Transurethral microwave thermotherapy, a procedure used in the treatment of lower urinary tract symptoms caused by benign prostatic hyperplasia
 Taipei University of Marine Technology